The seventh season of the French version of Dancing with the Stars  started on 15 October 2016 on TF1. It was hosted by Sandrine Quétier and Laurent Ournac. Before the end of the sixth season, TF1 announced the renewal of the show for a seventh season in 2016.

Participants

Scoring

Red numbers indicate the couples with the lowest score for each week.
Blue numbers indicate the couples with the highest score for each week.
 indicates the couples eliminated that week.
 indicates the returning couple that finished in the bottom two.
 indicates the winning couple.
 indicates the runner-up couple.
 indicates the third place couple.

Averages 
This table only counts dances scored on the traditional 40-point scale. Starting in week 4, both technical and artistic scores were tallied.

Highest and lowest scoring performances
The best and worst performances in each dance according to the judges' marks were as follows (starting in week 4, an average of the technical and artistic scores was used):

Couples' highest and lowest scoring performances
According to the traditional 40-point scale (starting in week 4, an average of the technical and artistic score was used):

Styles, scores and songs

Week 1 

 Individual judges' scores in the chart below (given in parentheses) are listed in this order from left to right: Fauve Hautot, Jean-Marc Généreux, Marie-Claude Pietragalla, Chris Marques.

Running order

Week 2 : Personal Story Week 

 Individual judges' scores in the chart below (given in parentheses) are listed in this order from left to right: Fauve Hautot, Jean-Marc Généreux, Marie-Claude Pietragalla, Chris Marques.

Running order

Week 3 : Spectators Week 

 Individual judges' scores in the chart below (given in parentheses) are listed in this order from left to right: Fauve Hautot, Jean-Marc Généreux, Marie-Claude Pietragalla, Chris Marques.

Running order

Week 4 : Double-score Showdown 

 Individual judges' scores in the chart below (given in parentheses) are listed in this order from left to right: Fauve Hautot, Jean-Marc Généreux, Marie-Claude Pietragalla, Chris Marques.

Running order

Relay Cha Cha Cha

Week 5 : Judges' Week 

 Individual judges' scores in the chart below (given in parentheses) are listed in this order from left to right: Fauve Hautot, Jean-Marc Généreux, Shy'm, Chris Marques.

Running order

Week 6 : Ladies' Night 

 Individual judges' scores in the chart below (given in parentheses) are listed in this order from left to right: Fauve Hautot, Jean-Marc Généreux, Marie-Claude Pietragalla, Chris Marques.

Running order

Raised Dance

Week 7 : Shameful Songs 

 Individual judges' scores in the chart below (given in parentheses) are listed in this order from left to right: Fauve Hautot, Jean-Marc Généreux, Marie-Claude Pietragalla, Chris Marques

Running order

Week 8 : Dance Trio 

 Individual judges' scores in the chart below (given in parentheses) are listed in this order from left to right: Fauve Hautot, Jean-Marc Genereux, Marie-Claude Pietragalla, Chris Marques

Running order

Week 9 : Judges' Week 

 Individual judges' scores in the chart below (given in parentheses) are listed in this order from left to right: Fauve Hautot, Jean-Marc Genereux, Marie-Claude Pietragalla, Chris Marques

Running order

Week 10 Finals 
 Individual judges' scores in the chart below (given in parentheses) are listed in this order from left to right: Fauve Hautot, Jean-Marc Généreux, Marie-Claude Pietragalla, Chris Marques

Running order

Musical guests

Ratings

References

Season 07
2016 French television seasons